Vedran Ješe born (born 3 February 1981) is a Croatian footballer who currently plays for HNK Primorac Biograd na Moru.

Club career
Born in Banja Luka, where he practiced handball, Ješe took up football after emigrating to Zagreb at 13 years of age, at HAŠK. Soon he was scouted and taken into the NK Zagreb academy where he started his professional career. With Zagreb he won the Croatian First Football League title in the 2001/02 season. In September 2004, due to political pressure, he joined Dinamo Zagreb, staying one season at the club before moving on to Inter Zaprešić.

Ješe signed a 3-year contract for FC Thun in 2006.

On 15 September 2009, he signed for FK Olimpik Sarajevo. On 31 January 2010, he signed for Greek side Kavala FC. Playing there for only one season he then joined NK Široki Brijeg. Playing there until the summer of 2014 when he signed for NK Zadar.

International career
He was part of the Croatia national under-21 football team at 2004 UEFA European Under-21 Football Championship. Ješe made his senior debut for Croatia in a January 2006 Carlsberg Cup match against South Korea and has earned a total of 2 caps, scoring no goals. His other international was three days later at the same tournament against Hong Kong.

References

External links

dinamozg.net 
Profile of Dimitar Makriev on 1hnl.net 
http://www.hns-cff.hr/?ln=hr&w=statistike&repka=A&id=19380
football.ch profile

1981 births
Living people
Sportspeople from Banja Luka
Bosnia and Herzegovina emigrants to Croatia
Croats of Bosnia and Herzegovina
Association football defenders
Bosnia and Herzegovina footballers
Croatian footballers
Croatia youth international footballers
Croatia under-21 international footballers
Croatia international footballers
NK Zagreb players
GNK Dinamo Zagreb players
NK Inter Zaprešić players
FC Thun players
Bnei Yehuda Tel Aviv F.C. players
F.C. Ashdod players
FK Olimpik players
Kavala F.C. players
NK Široki Brijeg players
NK Zadar players
HNK Primorac Biograd na Moru players
Croatian Football League players
Second Football League (Croatia) players
Swiss Super League players
Israeli Premier League players
Premier League of Bosnia and Herzegovina players
Croatian expatriate footballers
Expatriate footballers in Switzerland
Croatian expatriate sportspeople in Switzerland
Expatriate footballers in Israel
Croatian expatriate sportspeople in Israel
Expatriate footballers in Greece
Croatian expatriate sportspeople in Greece